Mianabad (also Romanized as Mīānābād; also known as Mīnābād) is a village in Kharqan Rural District, Bastam District, Shahrud County, Semnan Province, Iran. At the 2006 census, its population was 539, in 143 families.

References 

Populated places in Shahrud County